Lacustricola margaritatus is a species of fish in the family Procatopodidae. This species is endemic to freshwater habitats in the Lake Victoria and Lake Kyoga basins in eastern Africa. It is currently known from streams and swamps in the Lake Victoria basin in north-western Tanzania, south-western Kenya and southern Uganda, and in the Lake Kyoga basin in central Uganda.

Sources

Links
 Lacustricola margaritatus on WildNothos 

margaritatus
Fish described in 2022